Luca Betti (born 22 February 1978) is an Italian rally driver who is currently competing in the 2013 World Rally Championship season in the WRC-2 class. He began rallying in the WRC at the 2000 Rally GB and has entered various rallies since, particularly in the Junior World Rally Championship. He has also competed in the European Rally Championship finishing runner-up in 2011 and in the 3rd place in 2012 .

WRC results

* Season still in progress.

JWRC results

WRC 2 results

* Season still in progress.

External links

Luca Betti at eWRC-results.com

1978 births
Living people
World Rally Championship drivers
European Rally Championship drivers
Intercontinental Rally Challenge drivers
Italian rally drivers